These are the Australian Country number-one albums of 2001, per the ARIA Charts.

See also
2001 in music
List of number-one albums of 2001 (Australia)

References

2001
Count
Aust